Circleville is an unincorporated community located in Pendleton County, West Virginia, United States. Circleville was originally named Zyrkleville after John Zyrkle, who ran a dry goods store in the town. The old Circleville School is listed on the National Register of Historic Places.

Circleville is located on West Virginia Route 28 along the North Fork of South Branch of the Potomac River at its confluence with Pike Gap and Bouses Runs.

In Literature
In his controversial 2001 book, At Home in the Heart of Appalachia, John O'Brien refers to Circleville as a "lonely outpost in the ice-cold mountains."

References

Unincorporated communities in Pendleton County, West Virginia
Unincorporated communities in West Virginia